Following is a list of notable architects from the country of Slovenia.

A–M

Ilija Arnautović
Max Fabiani
Boris Kobe
Ciril Metod Koch
Franko Luin
Marko Mušič

N–Z

Jože Plečnik
Boris Podrecca
Marjetica Potrč
Edvard Ravnikar
Vojteh Ravnikar
Savin Sever
Vladimir Šubic
Viktor Sulčič
Ivan Vurnik

See also

 Architecture of Slovenia
 List of architects
 List of Slovenes

Slovenia
Architect